The 2011–12 season is the 16th edition of Europe's premier basketball tournament for women - EuroLeague Women since it was rebranded to its current format.

Regular season
Regular season groups started on 12 October 2011 and finished on 1 February 2012.

Group A

Group B

Group C

Round 2
Game 1 was played on 21 February 2012. Game 2 was played on 24 February 2012. Game 3 was played on 29 February 2012. The first team to win two games advanced to the quarterfinals. Galatasaray Medical Park qualified directly to the quarterfinals as host of the Final Eight.

Final eight

Semifinal round
Final Eight was held in Istanbul. The semifinal round was played in a round robin system with two groups of four teams. The two group winners played the final game.

Group A

Group B

Classification 7–8

Classification 5–6

Classification 3–4

Final

References

External links
 FIBA Europe

    
2011–12